Music Bank is a box set of a large variety of songs by the American rock band Alice in Chains. It was released on October 26, 1999 on Columbia Records. The box set includes previously unreleased demos, hit singles, remixes, alternative versions and four new songs, "Fear the Voices", "Get Born Again", "Lying Season", and "Died". The track "Fear the Voices" was released as a single to promote the box set. Music Bank peaked at No. 123 on the Billboard 200 chart.

Overview
The box set consists of three music discs, 48 songs, including rarities, previously unreleased demos and mixes by the band, and previously released and remastered material from their albums Facelift, Sap, Dirt, Jar of Flies, Alice in Chains and Unplugged and a CD-ROM disc containing various multimedia. 

In 1998, vocalist Layne Staley reunited with Alice in Chains to record two new songs, "Get Born Again" and "Died".  Originally written for Jerry Cantrell's solo album Degradation Trip, the songs were released on Music Bank.

Track listing

Disc one

Disc two

Disc three

Chart positions

Album

Singles

Personnel
Mark Arm – vocals on "Right Turn"
Jeff Beck – graphic design
Jerry Cantrell – guitar, vocals, liner notes pages 48–53, compilation title, cover concept
Chris Cornell – vocals on "Right Turn"
Peter Cronin – photography
Paul Hernandez – photography
Mike Inez – bass (disc 1: track 1, disc 2: tracks 16 & 17, disc 3: tracks 3–11, 13–14), guitar (disc 3: track 12)
Dennis Keeley – photography
Sean Kinney – drums, liner notes (inner box), concept, cover concept, supervisor, direction, production concept
Stephen Marcussen – mastering
Scott Olson – guitar (disc 3: tracks 11 & 13), bass (disc 3: track 12)
Layne Staley – vocals, guitar ("Angry Chair", "Hate to Feel", "Head Creeps", "Died")
Mike Starr – bass (disc 1: tracks 2–17, disc 2: tracks 1–15, disc 3: tracks 1–2)
Ann Wilson – vocals on "Am I Inside"
Jonathan Meyer – graphic assistant
Peter Fletcher – compilation producer, foreword
Neil Zlozower – photography
Jeffrey Mayer – photography
Catherine Wessel – photography
Karen Moskowitz – photography
Michael Simpson – package supervision
Mary Maurer – art direction, design
Chris Cuffaro – photography
Doug Erb – design
Danny Clinch – photography
Steffan Chirazi – liner notes
Marty Temme – photography
Brandy Flower – design
Christopher Wray-McCann – photography

References

Alice in Chains compilation albums
1999 compilation albums
Columbia Records compilation albums